Shawn Chin (born May 11, 1989) is an American professional soccer player.

Personal
Chin is of Jamaican and Chinese descent. He was born and raised in Miami, Florida, and attended Felix Varela High School, where he was named Miami Player of the Year in 2007 as his school's leading scorer (58 goals), before going on to play two years of college soccer at Boston College. While at Boston College, he was named to the ACC All-Rookie team as a freshman in 2007, before transferring to the University of South Florida prior to his junior year.

Professional career

FC Edmonton
Chin turned professional in 2011 when he signed with North American Soccer League side FC Edmonton. He made his professional debut on May 4, 2011, in a 2011 Canadian Championship game against Toronto FC, and scored his first professional goal on May 31 in a 4–0 win over FC Tampa Bay.

Minnesota Stars FC 
After FC Edmonton, Chin signed with Minnesota Stars FC of the North American Soccer League.  They went on to become the runners-up of the NASL.

VSI Tampa Bay 
Chin joined VSI Tampa Bay FC of the United Soccer League shortly after leaving Minnesota Stars FC.  He went on to score eight goals in 24 appearances as a right midfielder.  Shortly after the 2013 season VSI Tampa Bay FC was shut down.

Fort Lauderdale Strikers 
Chin was signed by Fort Lauderdale Strikers of the North American Soccer League as soon as VSI Tampa Bay was shut down.  He made over 50 appearances in 2 seasons becoming a top 10 modern era appearance holder for the club.  Chin was an integral part of the club that finished runners-up in 2014 and 3rd place in 2015.  In 2014, Chin lead in the assists category for the club and became the first signing for the 2015 season.  He also finished 2nd in assist in the North American Soccer League.

San Antonio FC 
After Fort Lauderdale Strikers Chin signed with San Antonio FC of the United Soccer League in January 2016 as a forward.  During the 2016 season, Chin scored 3 goals and notched 1 assist in 17 games while logging 821 minutes.

Colorado Springs Switchbacks 
On September 8, 2017, Chin moved to United Soccer League side Colorado Springs Switchbacks.

Miami FC 
On March 5, 2018, Chin signed with "Miami FC 2," The National Premier Soccer League side for Miami FC, ahead of their inaugural season. He made six appearances during the regular season as his team went on to win the NPSL National Championship. In 2019, Chin played a bigger role with the team, now going by just "Miami FC," playing in all but one of the team's regular season games. The team repeated as NPSL Champions, beating New York Cosmos B on August 3, with Chin scoring the final goal in the 3-1 win.

Chin stayed with the team when it moved to the newly created National Independent Soccer Association in Fall 2019. He played in five of the team's regular season games and came in as a second half substitute in NISA East Coast Championship, which Miami won 3-0 over Stumptown Athletic.

International 
Chin joined the United States U-20 national team for camp in 2008, and played against Guatemala and Honduras.  He became tournament Champions with the US U-20, where he had a goal and assist in three caps.

References

External links
 Edmonton profile
 USF bio
 Boston College bio
 US Soccer player bio

1989 births
Living people
American soccer players
American expatriate soccer players
Boston College Eagles men's soccer players
South Florida Bulls men's soccer players
FC Edmonton players
Minnesota United FC (2010–2016) players
VSI Tampa Bay FC players
Fort Lauderdale Strikers players
San Antonio FC players
Colorado Springs Switchbacks FC players
Miami FC players
North American Soccer League players
National Independent Soccer Association players
Expatriate soccer players in Canada
United States men's under-20 international soccer players
Soccer players from Florida
Hakka sportspeople
Association football forwards
Association football midfielders
American people of Chinese descent
American people of Jamaican descent